"Powerful Thing" is a song written by Al Anderson and Sharon Vaughn, and recorded by American country music artist Trisha Yearwood.  It was released in November 1998 as the third single from her album Where Your Road Leads.  The song reached number 6 on the Billboard Hot Country Singles & Tracks chart in March 1999 and number 1 on the RPM Country Tracks chart in Canada.

Critical reception
Deborah Evans Price, of Billboard magazine reviewed the song favorably, calling it "perky and playful." She goes on to say that while the lyric is "slightly clichéd", the song makes up for it because of her "incredible voice and tons of personality."

Chart performance
"Powerful" debuted at number seventy on the U.S. Billboard Hot Country Singles & Tracks for the week of November 28, 1998.

Year-end charts

References

1998 singles
1998 songs
Trisha Yearwood songs
Songs written by Al Anderson (NRBQ)
Songs written by Sharon Vaughn
Song recordings produced by Tony Brown (record producer)
MCA Nashville Records singles